The women's discus throw competition at the 2016 Summer Olympics in Rio de Janeiro, Brazil was held at the Olympic Stadium on 16–17 August. Each athlete received three throws in the qualifying round. All who achieved the qualifying distance progressed to the final. Each finalist was allowed three throws in last round, with the top eight athletes after that point being given three further attempts.

Summary
Mélina Robert-Michon took the lead with a 65.52 m on the first throw of the final competition.  On the second throw, Nadine Müller threw 63.13 m.  On the third throw, Su Xinyue threw 63.88 m to move into silver position.  Those three throws held up until Dani Samuels displaced Müller near the end of the round.  Müller couldn't land another legal throw.  Nobody could improve their position through the second round.  In the third round, world champion Denia Caballero moved into silver position with her best 65.34 m.  Two throws later, Sandra Perković lander her only legal throw of the competition  to leapfrog from the brink of elimination to gold.  The medal positions were set, but on her fifth round throw Robert-Michon, improved her mark to 66.73 m, a new French record.

The following evening the medals were presented by Claudia Bokel, IOC member, Germany and Geoffrey Gardner, Council Member of the IAAF.

Schedule
All times are Brasília Time (UTC−3).

Records
, the existing World and Olympic records were as follows.

The following national record was established during the competition:

Results

Qualifying round

Qual. rule: qualification standard 62.00 m (Q) or at least best 12 qualified (q).

Final

References

Women's discus throw
2016
2016 in women's athletics
Women's events at the 2016 Summer Olympics